Local government elections took place in London, and some other parts of the United Kingdom on Thursday 6 May 1982. Ward changes took place in Enfield which increased the total number of councillors by 6 from 1,908 to 1,914.

All London borough council seats were up for election. Both major parties lost votes to the SDP-Liberal Alliance, but whilst the Conservatives gained 20 council seats, Labour lost 101.

The party's result of 30.4%, 12 councils and 781 councillors was the worst Labour result since 1968.

The previous Borough elections in London were in 1978.

To date, this remains the last London local election in which the Conservatives won a majority of council seats or councils, as well as the last time the party won over 40% of the vote. The Conservatives would not win the popular vote in a London local election for another two decades, and would not win a plurality of seats in London again until the election of 2006, 24 years later.

Results summary

Turnout: 2,233,386 voters cast ballots.

Council results

Borough result maps

References

 
May 1982 events in the United Kingdom
1982